1944 in professional wrestling describes the year's events in the world of professional wrestling.

List of notable promotions 
Only one promotion held notable shows in 1944.

Calendar of notable shows

Notable events
Paul Jones starts the Georgia Championship Wrestling professional wrestling promotion based in Atlanta, Georgia.

Championship changes

EMLL

Debuts
Debut date uncertain:
June Byers
Killer Kowalski
Roy Heffernan

Births
Date of birth unknown:
Larry O'Day(died in 1997)
Mike Webster 
January 1  Jimmy Hart
April 4: 
Tiger Jeet Singh
El Sicodélico
April 20  Bob Bruggers 
May 25 - Victor Rivera (wrestler)
May 29  Ronnie P. Gossett(died in 2007)
June 1  Diamond Lil
June 30  Terry Funk
July 12  Ric Drasin (died in 2020) 
August 3  Roland Bock 
August 10  Jim Crockett Jr.(died in 2021)
August 14  Bobby Duncum Sr.
August 24  Rocky Johnson(died in 2020) 
August 31  Jos LeDuc(died in 1999)
September 12  Lonnie Mayne(died in 1978)
October 4  Michel Martel(died in 1978)
October 21:
Jonathan Boyd(died in 1999)
Butch Miller
October 31 - Roy Callender
November 1  Bobby Heenan(died in 2017)
November 2  Michael Buffer

Deaths
April 30  Ernst Roeber (72)
September 9  Gus Sonnenberg (46)

References

 
professional wrestling